Epacris rigida is a species of flowering plant in the family Ericaceae and is endemic to south-eastern New South Wales. It is an erect to spreading shrub with egg-shaped to more or less circular leaves and sweetly-scented, cream-coloured, tube-shaped flowers.

Description

Taxonomy and naming
Epacris robusta was first formally described in 1868 by George Bentham in Flora Australiensis from specimens collected by Ferdinand von Mueller near the headwaters of the Genoa River.<ref name="Benth.">{{cite book |last1=Bentham |first1=George |last2=von Mueller |first2=Ferdinand |title=Flora Australiensis |date=1868 |publisher=Lovell Reeve & Co. |location=London |page=237 |url=https://www.biodiversitylibrary.org/item/42070#page/246/mode/1up |access-date=12 July 2022}}</ref> The specific epithet (robusta'') means "hard" or "firm".

Distribution and habitat
This epacris grows in heath or rocky slopes at altitudes above  in New South Wales and the Australian Capital Territory, but mainly south of the Tinderry Range.

References

robusta
Ericales of Australia
Flora of New South Wales
Flora of the Australian Capital Territory
Taxa named by George Bentham
Plants described in 1868